Cynthia Martin ( Cindy Martin; born 1961) is a comic book artist best known for her work on the Marvel Comics Star Wars title during its waning years in the mid-1980s. She was one of the few women working in mainstream American comics during that time.

Martin's clean lines and strong sense of movement during action scenes set her apart from other Star Wars artists of the time in addition to being one of the few women working in comics. Her work displayed the influence of Japanese manga long before it became common in American comics.

Career
The first comic Martin worked on was the Ms. Victory Special #1 (AC Comics, 1985). She then got the Star Wars assignment, where she did the covers for issues 92 and 93, and then the pencils for most of the issues between 94 and 107. Besides AC and Marvel, Martin has worked for DC Comics, Eclipse Comics, First Comics, Topps Comics, Dark Horse Comics, and a number of other small presses.

Martin then began illustrating early-reader "graphic biographies" for Capstone Press. She also illustrated Edge Books: How to Draw Comic Heroes . According to her bio on Silver Phoenix Entertainment, Martin's currents projects include books for ABDO Publications and the graphic novel Shadowflight.

On May 1, 2010, she was inducted as an Honorary Member of the 501st Legion international costuming organization in recognition of her contributions to the Star Wars saga.

Bibliography 
Comics work includes:

Marvel 
 Star Wars 92, 93 (covers only), 94–97, 100–101, 103–107
 Web of Spider-Man 2, 4, 33
 Marvel Comics Presents 60–67
 The Amazing Spider-Man 295
 Midnight Sons 1
 Spectacular Spider-Man 133

DC Comics 
 Wonder Woman 45, 50, 52, 60, Annual 2
 War of the Gods 1, 2
 Blue Beetle 3, 6

Eclipse Comics 
 Total Eclipse
 California Girls 6
 Dragonflight

AC Comics 
 Ms. Victory #1 (AC Comics)
 Bad Girl Backlash (AC Comics) 1

Other publishers 
 Atilla the Ham (Modanim Company) production
 Big Guy and Rusty (Sony Children's Entertainment) storyboards
 Crossroads (First Comics) 1
 Elvira, Mistress of the Dark (Claypool Comics) 9, 25
 Fan Base (Komikwerks)
 Go Girls (Dark Horse Comics) 1–3 (cover art)
 Jason Goes to Hell (Topps Comics) 1
 Psi Kix (Krislin Company) storyboards
 Renegade Romance (Renegade Press) 1
 Roller Derby Drama (Silver Phoenix Entertainment) 1
 SPECWAR (Peter Four Productions) colorist
 Wild Irish Roses (Conari Press)
 Zoombies (Boom Studios)

Capstone Press graphic novels 
 Elizabeth Blackwell: America's First Woman Doctor
 George Washington: Leading a New Nation
 Helen Keller: Courageous Advocate
 Jane Goodall: Animal Scientist
 Sacagawea: Journey into the West
 Theodore Roosevelt
 Wilma Rudolph: Olympic Track Star
 Elizabeth Cady Stanton: Women's Rights Pioneer
 Booker T. Washington: Great American Educator
 Hedy Lamarr and a Secret Communication System
 Story of the Statue of Liberty
 Story of the Star-Spangled Banner
 Nathan Hale: Revolutionary Spy
 Max Axiom, Super Scientist: Sound
 Max Axiom, Super Scientist: Adaptation
 Max Axiom, Super Scientist: Food Chains
 Max Axiom, Super Scientist: Magnetism
 Max Axiom, Super Scientist: Global Warming

Notes

References 

 Capstone Press
 Cynthia Martin bio at Silver Phoenix Entertainment
 Hudson, Mark. Home of the Lost Star Warriors Original Art Annex!
 Cynthia Martin at Lambiek's Comiclopedia
 Sautter, Aaron and Cynthia Martin. How to Draw Comic Heroes (Edge Books, 2007). 
 dANdeLION. Our Very Own Cynthia Martin!, Kevin's Watch: By Stephen R. Donaldson Fans for Stephen R. Donaldson Fans (June 20, 2007)]. Retrieved July 19, 2008.

External links
Cynthia West at Comic Vine

American female comics artists
Living people
Place of birth missing (living people)
1961 births